CICF-FM is a Canadian radio station broadcasting at 105.7 FM in Vernon, British Columbia with a country format branded on-air as Pure Country 105.7. The station is owned by Bell Media.

The station began broadcasting on October 23, 1978 at 1050 kHz as CKAL. In 1981, CKAL added FM transmitters to rebroadcast the programming of CKAL in Nakusp, New Denver, and Kaslo, while another one was added to Armstrong/Enderby on 89.7 MHz in 1986. CKAL became CICF in 1987. The rebroadcasters CICF-FM-2 New Denver and CICF-FM-3 Kaslo were granted to change their programming source from CICF to CKKC in Nelson in 1990, and CICF-FM-1 Nakusp was shut down in 1997 and taken over by CKKC. The "CKAL" calls are now used by a television station in Calgary, Alberta.

On November 28, 2001, CICF moved to FM band at 105.7 MHz, and became hot adult contemporary station Sun FM. CICF was acquired by Astral Media in 2007 along with the former terrestrial broadcasting assets of Standard Radio. By 2010, CICF switched to CHR/Top 40. On November 19, 2020, the station flipped to country as Pure Country 105.7, becoming the latest Bell Media station to adopt the "Pure Country" branding. CIMX-FM in Windsor, Ontario and CJCJ-FM in Woodstock, New Brunswick would also switch to the "Pure Country" format and branding the same day.

References

External links
 Pure Country 105.7
 
 

Icf
Icf
Icf
Vernon, British Columbia
Radio stations established in 1978
1978 establishments in British Columbia